General elections were held in Mozambique between 3 and 5 December 1999 to elect a president and the Assembly of the Republic. Incumbent president Joaquim Chissano won a narrow victory against Afonso Dhlakama, whilst Chissano's  FRELIMO party won the Assembly elections, taking 133 of the 250 seats. Voter turnout for the elections was around 68–70%.

Results

President

Assembly

References

Presidential elections in Mozambique
Elections in Mozambique
Mozambique
1999 in Mozambique
December 1999 events in Africa